Hugo Becker (born 13 May 1987) is a French actor, director and producer. He is known for his roles as Louis Grimaldi in the American drama television series Gossip Girl and Romain in the French thriller series Chefs.

Career
Becker attended the Conservatory of Dramatic Art in France, the court Florent (Olga Hörstig Prize) and the Royal Academy of Dramatic Art of London.

He was part of the promotion of Young Talents Cannes in 2010. That same year, he made his debut on screen in a variety of roles. He played a young politician in L'Assaut, directed by Julien Leclercq, an alcoholic hitchhiker in La Proie, directed by Eric Valette, a student in Marie-Castille Mention Schaar's Ma Première Fois and a young businessman in La Croisière, by Pascale Pouzadoux.

In 2010, he made his debut in Hollywood, playing Louis Grimaldi, Prince of Monaco, in the CW drama Gossip Girl. Initially, he signed on for two episodes in the fourth season. Later, his role was extended for another eighteen episodes.

In 2011, he played Xavier in the American film Damsels in Distress, directed by Whit Stillman. The film closed the 68th Venice Film Festival and was selected at the Toronto Film Festival.

In 2012, Becker starred as Antoine Lavoisier in the American docufiction Mystery of the Matter, directed by Mr. Meyer. In 2013, Hugo played Isaac Dreyfuss, a football star involved in a terrorist affair, for two episodes of the BBC1 series Silent Witness.

In 2014, he played the role of Romain in the 6 episodes of the miniseries Chefs alongside Clovis Cornillac, for which he received the Adami Prize for the best promising actor at the Luchon festival.

Since 2014, he has been one of the producers at Nouvelle Donne Productions.

In 2015 and 2018, he played the lead role of André Merlaux, a young recruit to the French secret service in the year 1960, in the two seasons (24 episodes) of the French television series Au service de la France, known in English as A Very Secret Service.

In 2016, he began playing the role of Cyril Balsan in the political drama series Baron Noir alongside Niels Arestrup, Kad Merad and Anna Mouglalis. In the same year, he starred in a main role alongside Yon González and Lluís Homar in the Spanish crime drama series Bajo sospecha. He played the role of a police officer infiltrated to find a missing person in a hospital in Madrid. He also played the role of Guillaume in the comedy Un jour mon prince, directed by Flavia Coste.

In 2018, he starred in Xavier Durringer's Paradise Beach alongside Sami Bouajila, Kool Shen, Seth Gueko and Tewfik Jallab. In the same year, he starred in Jusqu'ici tout va bien, by Mohamed Hamidi, alongside Gilles Lellouche, Malik Bentalha and Sabrina Ouazani.

In 2019, he starred as Paul Vanhove in the Netflix science fiction series Osmosis. He is set to play a role as Paul WR in Le dernier voyage de l'énigmatique Paul W.R. by Romain Quirot and as Max in the film Döner directed by Jean-Luc Herbulot.

Hugo Becker is fluent in English and Spanish.

Filmography

Film

Television

Theatre

Awards and nominations

References

External links
 

1987 births
21st-century French male actors
French male film actors
French male television actors
Living people
Actors from Metz
Cours Florent alumni
Alumni of RADA